The 2021–22 Premier League of Eswatini is the season of the Premier League of Eswatini, the top-tier football league in Eswatini (formerly Swaziland), that started in November 2021.

Teams
The 2019–20 season was abandoned with no teams relegated, so the 2020–21 season began with 16 instead of 14 teams. For this season, 4 teams were due to be relegated, in order to return the number to 14 for the following season. However, the Premier League of Eswatini challenged the Eswatini Football Association decision, and two of the four relegated teams challenged the decision.

League table

</onlyinclude>

Stadiums

References

Football leagues in Eswatini
Premier League
Premier League
Eswatini